The Standard Form of National Characters or the Standard Typefaces for Chinese Characters is the standardized form of Chinese characters set by the Ministry of Education of the Republic of China (Taiwan).

Lists 
There are three lists of the Standard Form of National Characters, promulgated by Taiwan's Ministry of Education:

 Chart of Standard Forms of Common National Characters , including 4,808 commonly used Chinese characters.
 Chart of Standard Forms of Less-Than-Common National Characters,  including secondary commonly used  6,329 characters.
 Chart of Rarely-Used National Characters, including 18,319 rarely used characters.

Characteristics
Note: Viewing this section correctly requires certain standard typefaces to be installed and the browser to be configured to use them in appropriate contexts.

The Standard Form of National Characters tends to adopt orthodox variants for most of its characters, but it still adopts many common vulgar variants. Many have their components rearranged. For example:
 The orthodox form of this character has 君 above 羊, i.e. 羣.
 The orthodox form of this character has 山 above 夆, i.e. 峯.
 The orthodox form of this character has 里 inside 衣, i.e. 裏.

Other vulgar variants which are extremely common in handwriting have been adopted. For example:
 The orthodox form of this character has 亼 above 卩, i.e. .

Some forms which were standardized have never been used or are extremely rare. For example:
 Before this standard was created, the second horizontal stroke was almost always the longest, i.e. .

Some components are differentiated where most other standards do not differentiate. For example:
They are differentiated in that 月 has two horizontal strokes where ⺼ has two dots resembling .
They are differentiated in that the horizontal strokes of 卝 do not pass through the vertical strokes.

This standard tends to follow a rule of writing regular script where there should be no more than one of ㇏ (called ), long horizontal stroke, or hook to the right (e.g. ㇂ ㇃) in a character.
 The first horizontal strokes in these characters are long horizontal strokes. Therefore, long dots are used in place of a regular right falling stroke ㇏ as their last strokes. Other standards use ㇏ as the last stroke, e.g. Mainland China and Japan.
 This character has a long horizontal stroke, so it cannot have a hook to the right. Other standards do not follow this rule as closely, e.g. Mainland China and Japan.

References

Chinese characters
Language education in Taiwan